The men's 400 metres hurdles event at the 1960 Olympic Games took place between August 31 and September 2. There were 34 competitors from 23 nations. The maximum number of athletes per nation had been set at 3 since the 1930 Olympic Congress. The event was won by Glenn Davis of the United States, the first man to successfully defend an Olympic title in the 400 metres hurdles. As of the 2016 Games, he remains the only man to do so; three others have won two gold medals in the event, but all three did so in nonconsecutive Games. It was the United States' fifth consecutive and 10th overall victory in the event. The Americans also completed their second consecutive (and fourth overall) medal sweep in the event, as Cliff Cushman took silver and Dick Howard took bronze.

Background

This was the 12th time the event was held. It had been introduced along with the men's 200 metres hurdles in 1900, with the 200 being dropped after 1904 and the 400 being held through 1908 before being left off the 1912 programme. However, when the Olympics returned in 1920 after World War I, the men's 400 metres hurdles was back and would continue to be contested at every Games thereafter.

One of the six finalists from the 1956 Games returned: gold medalist Glenn Davis of the United States. Davis was favored to repeat; he had lowered his own world record to 49.2 seconds in 1958 and taken four of the last five AAU titles (not competing in the 1959 event). He was joined on the American team by Dick Howard (Pan American runner-up, 1959 AAU champion) and Cliff Cushman (third at the PanAm Games). The biggest challenger to Davis was Gert Potgieter of South Africa, the 1958 Commonwealth Games champion and 440 yards hurdles world record holder who had been in medal contention in the 1956 Olympic final before hitting the last hurdle and finishing sixth. Potgieter, however, had been injured in an automobile accident and was unable to compete in Rome.

Iraq, Kenya, Morocco, Norway, and Tunisia each made their debut in the event; East and West Germany competed together as the United Team of Germany for the first time. The United States made its 12th appearance, the only nation to have competed at every edition of the event to that point.

Competition format

The competition used the three-round format used every Games since 1908 (except the four-round competition in 1952): quarterfinals, semifinals, and a final. Ten sets of hurdles were set on the course. The hurdles were 3 feet (91.5 centimetres) tall and were placed 35 metres apart beginning 45 metres from the starting line, resulting in a 40 metres home stretch after the last hurdle. The 400 metres track was standard.

A significant change, however, was the introduction of the "fastest loser" system. Previously, advancement depended solely on the runners' place in their heat. The 1960 competition added advancement places to the fastest runners across the heats in the quarterfinals who did not advance based on place.

There were 6 quarterfinal heats with between 5 and 6 athletes each. The top 2 men in each quarterfinal advanced to the semifinals, along with the next 2 fastest overall. The 14 semifinalists were divided into 2 semifinals of 7 athletes each, with the top 3 in each semifinal advancing to the 6-man final.

Records

Prior to the competition, the existing world and Olympic records were as follows.

Four runners went under 50 seconds (hand-timed) in the final, the first time any had done so in the Olympics. Glenn Davis's time of 49.3 seconds was the new record.

Schedule

The competition used a three-day schedule, with each round on a separate day, for the first time.

All times are Central European Time (UTC+1)

Results

Quarterfinals

The fastest two hurdlers in each of the six heats and the next two fastest advanced to the semifinal round.

Quarterfinal 1

Quarterfinal 2

Quarterfinal 3

Quarterfinal 4

Quarterfinal 5

Quarterfinal 6

Semifinals

The fastest three hurdlers in each of the two heats advanced to the final round.

Semifinal 1

Semifinal 2

Final

Results summary

References

M
400 metres hurdles at the Olympics
Men's events at the 1960 Summer Olympics